Hycleus is a genus of blister beetle belonging to the Meloidae family found in Africa and Asia. The genus contains over 400 species, which historically have been confused with the genus Mylabris.

Ecology
Adults feed mainly on flowers from a wide range of plant families. The first larval instar is an active triungulin form that is a predator of soft insects such as aphids. While the young are often beneficial to crops by suppressing other plant feeders, the adults can be a problem when present in large numbers. Flower feeding leads to lower yield and this can be a problem in some leguminous crops. They are however easily controlled by manual collection.

In northern Nigeria, heavy infestations of Hycleus terminatus, Hycleus fimbriatus, Hycleus hermanniae, and Hycleus chevrolati have affected early plantings of pearl millet crops.

Gallery

Partial list of species
 Hycleus aegyptiacus 
 Hycleus allardi 
 Hycleus apicipennis 
 Hycleus arabicus 
 Hycleus belli 
 Hycleus higuttatus 
 Hycleus bipunctatus 
 Hycleus birecurvus 
 Hycleus bistillatus 
 Hycleus burchmannianus 
 Hycleus brevetarsalis 
 Hycleus chodschenticus 
 Hycleus cingulatus 
 Hycleus colligatus 
 Hycleus concinnus 
 Hycleus curticornis 
 Hycleus damohensis 
 Hycleus diversesignatus 
 Hycleus dohrni 
 Hycleus dolens 
 Hycleus esfandiarii 
 Hycleus flavohirtus 
 Hycleus gratiosus 
 Hycleus hanguensis 
 Hycleus himalayaensis 
 Hycleus hokumanensis 
 Hycleus horai 
 Hycleus infasciculatus 
 Hycleus japonicus 
 Hycleus javeti 
 Hycleus kirgisicus 
 Hycleus lacteus 
 Hycleus ligatus          
 Hycleus lindbergi          
 Hycleus linnavuorii           
 Hycleus mannheimsi          
 Hycleus mediozigzagus         
 Hycleus mediobipunctatus 
 Hycleus mediofasciatellus           
 Hycleus medioinsignatus         
 Hycleus nigrohirtus 
 Hycleus ocellaris 
 Hycleus ornatus 
 Hycleus parvulus           
 Hycleus phaleratus           
 Hycleus pierrei           
 Hycleus pitcheri 
 Hycleus postbilunulatus        
 Hycleus posticatus          
 Hycleus praeustus         
 Hycleus pseudobrunnipes           
 Hycleus pustulatus           
 Hycleus quatuordecimpunctatus           
 Hycleus raphael           
 Hycleus rotroui 
 Hycleus rubricollis 
 Hycleus scabratus           
 Hycleus scapularis        
 Hycleus schauffelei         
 Hycleus schoenherri           
 Hycleus sialanus           
 Hycleus silbermanni           
 Hycleus solanensis           
 Hycleus soumacovi           
 Hycleus subparallelus           
 Hycleus talhouki           
 Hycleus talyshensis           
 Hycleus tekkensis           
 Hycleus tenuepictus           
 Hycleus theryanus           
 Hycleus thunbergi           
 Hycleus tigripennis           
 Hycleus trianguliferus           
 Hycleus varius           
 Hycleus wagneri

References

External links
 Biolib.cz

Meloidae
Beetles of Asia
Insect pests of millets